Thomas Acda (born Amsterdam, 6 March 1967) is a Dutch singer, actor and comedian, known as former member of the duo Acda en De Munnik.

Acda grew up in De Rijp and after graduating high school at havo level, Acda started the theater school, but soon switched to the Kleinkunstacademie in Amsterdam. There he met Paul de Munnik. They finished school in 1993 with a joint project for which they were awarded the Pisuisse-prize. After that they split up and went their own way.

In 1995, Acda en De Munnik came together to make a theater show with the name Zwerf'On. The show was a success, and they were asked to put the songs from the show on CD. From that moment on, Acda en the Munnik were involved in both music and theater.

Acda was active on several projects. He was in the band Herman en Ik. He played in the television show In voor en tegenspoed. He was in the comedy redaction of the show Spijkers (later: Kopspijkers). Together with comedians Raoul Heertje and Harm Edens he was member of the panel in Dit was het nieuws (the Dutch version of Have I Got News for You) for several seasons. From 1997 on he played in several films, All stars, The missing link and Lek. For the soundtrack of the movie All Stars, the song Als Het Vuur Gedoofd Is from Acda en de Munnik was used. The film was a success in the Netherlands, so the VARA decided to turn it into a series, in which Acda starred as goalkeeper Willem. Every episode started with the song "Groen als gras" from Acda en De Munnik.

Filmography 
In Het Belang Van De Staat, 1997
All Stars, 1997
Fl. 19,99, 1998
Madelief: Krassen in het Tafelblad, 1998
Missing Link
Lek, 2000
In Oranje, 2004
De Scheepsjongens van Bontekoe, 2007
Alles is liefde, 2007
Lover of Loser, 2009
  Penoza (season 1),2010
 All Stars 2: Old Stars (2011)
 ''Flikken Maastricht, (2010–2013)

References

External links 

1967 births
Living people
People from Graft-De Rijp
Dutch cabaret performers
Dutch male television actors
Dutch musicians
Dutch male film actors